The castra of Buciumi was a fort in the Roman province of Dacia in the 2nd and 3rd centuries AD. Remains of the surrounding vicus were also unearthed. The castra's ruins are located in Buciumi, Romania.

Gallery

See also
List of castra

Notes

External links

Roman castra from Romania - Google Maps / Earth

Roman legionary fortresses in Dacia
Roman legionary fortresses in Romania
History of Crișana
Historic monuments in Sălaj County